The Attorney General of Guatemala (Fiscal General de la República de Guatemala) is the chief attorney general (public prosecutor) of Guatemala.

List of attorneys general

See also

 Justice ministry
 Politics of Guatemala

References

Law of Guatemala
Politics of Guatemala